This is a list of airlines of Ireland.

Scheduled airlines

Cargo airlines

See also 
 List of defunct airlines of the Republic of Ireland
 List of airports in Ireland
 Transport in Ireland

Ireland
Airlines
Airlines
Ireland
Airlines